B. V. Nandini Reddy is an Indian film director and screenwriter who works in Telugu cinema and television. She debuted with 2011 Telugu film, Ala Modalaindi.

Early life
Nandini Reddy was born in Hyderabad. Her father Bharath. V. Reddy was a Chartered accountant who is originally from Chittoor district, and is settled in Bangalore. Her mother Roopa Reddy is from the "Pingle" family hailing from Warangal district. Nandini has a younger brother named Uttam Reddy.

Reddy was educated at St. Ann's High School, Secunderabad, and earned a degree at Women's College, Koti. She also holds a master's degree in politic science from Jawaharlal Nehru University, New Delhi. She was active in dramatics, elocution and cricket throughout her school and college years. She is also one of the judges in a Telugu reality TV show Adhurs.

Career
Reddy was introduced to Gangaraju Gunnam through a mutual friend and in 1995 she worked on his children's movie Little Soldiers as an Assistant Director. After that film was released, cinematographer Rasool Ellore introduced her to Krishna Vamsi, who refused at the time to take her into his team. She was idle for a year before being offered work on the Kannada film Santhi Santhi Santhi. Actress Ramya Krishnan then persuaded Vamsi to take her for his next project, Chandralekha. She became an integral part of Vamsi's team up to and including the filming of Shakti, a Hindi remake of Anthahpuram.

Vamsi sent Reddy to Daggubati Suresh Babu, with whom she has worked for Suresh Productions.

in 2019, she directed her fourth film Oh! Baby, starring Samantha Akkineni. Produced by People's Media Productions and Guru Films along with Suresh Productions, this is the second time Samantha and Reddy worked together.

Filmography

Film

Television

Awards
 Nandi Award for Best First Film of a Director (2010) for Ala Modalaindi
 Nominated – Filmfare Award for Best Director – Telugu for Ala Modalaindi
 Hyderabad Times Film Awards 2011 – Best Screenplay for Ala Modalaindi.
SIIMA Award for Best Debut Director (Telugu) [2011] for Ala Modalaindi.
 Nominated - SIIMA Award for Best Director - Telugu for Oh! Baby

References

External links
 

Film directors from Hyderabad, India
Year of birth missing (living people)
Living people
Telugu film directors
Indian women film directors
21st-century Indian film directors
21st-century Indian women artists
Jawaharlal Nehru University alumni
Women artists from Andhra Pradesh

Nandi Award winners
South Indian International Movie Awards winners